Harley Procter Brown Jr. (January 13, 1921 – June 6, 2008) was an American biologist and an expert in certain types of aquatic beetles. He described over forty new species in his career.

Background and education

He was born in Uniontown, Alabama  and showed an early interest in insects. He received undergraduate and graduate degrees (1942) from Miami University in Oxford, Ohio. His thesis involved the lifecycle of the species Climacia areolaris of the family Sisyridae. He received a PhD from Ohio State University in Columbus, Ohio in 1945. His dissertation studied the flagellum of the protozoan with the electron microscope.

Academic career
Brown taught at the following institutions:
University of Idaho (Moscow), 1945-1947
Oregon Institute of Marine Biology (Charleston), 1946
Queens College (Flushing, New York), 1947–1948
University of Oklahoma (Norman), 1948–1984

Taxa described by Brown 
Taxa described by Brown include:
Dryopidae
Elmoparnus mexicanus (1970)
Elmidae
Austrelmis (1984)
Elsianus shoemakei (1971); synonym of Macrelmis by Motschulsky (1860)
Heterelmis comalensis (1988); with Bosse & Tuff
Heterelmis stephani (1972)
Hispaniolara 1981 (1981)
Hispaniolara farri (1981) 
Huleechius (1981) 
Huleechius carolus (1981)
Huleechius marroni (1981) 
Hydora annectens (1981); with Spangle 
Hydora lenta (1981); with Spangle 
Leptelmis philomina (1984); with Thobias 
Neocylloepus arringtoni (1970) 
Neocylloepus boeseli (1970) 
Neocylloepus (1970) 
Neocylloepus hintoni]] (1970) Neocylloepus petersoni (1970) Neocylloepus sandersoni (1970) Ovolara (1981) Parapotamophilus (1981) Parapotamophilus gressitti (1981) Pseudodisersus (1981) Pseudodisersus coquereli (1981); synonym of P. goudotii by Guérin-Méneville (1843) Stenelmis cheryl (1987) Stenelmis gammoni (1976); with WhiteStenelmis lignicola (1992); with Schmude Stenelmis occidentalis (1991); with Schmude Suzevia (1992); subgenus of Zaitzevia by Champion (1923) Xenelmis sandersoni (1985) Zaitzevia posthonia (1985)LutrochidaeLutrochus arizonicus (1970); with MurvoshPsephenidaeAlabameubria (1980); synonym of Dicranopselaphus by Guérin-Méneville (1861) Alabameubria starki (1980); synonym of Dicranopselaphus variegatus by Horn (1880) Mataeopsephus taiwanicus (1990); with Lee & Yang Psephenus arizonensis (1974); with Murvosh Psephenus montanus (1974); with Murvosh Psephenus murvoshi (1970) Psephenus texanus (1967); with Arrington Schinostethus flabellatus (1993) with Lee & Yang Schinostethus junghuaensis (1993) with Lee & Yang; synonym of S. satoi by Lee, Yang & Brown (1993) Schinostethus minutus (1993); with Lee & Yang Schinostethus niger (1993); with Lee & YangSchinostethus satoi (1993); with Lee & Yang

Taxa named in honor of Brown (Patronyms)
Taxa named in honor of Brown include:ElmidaeAustrolimnius browniDubiraphia browni Dubiraphia harleyi Hexanchorus browni Optioservus browniHydraenidae Hydraena browniOchthebius browniLimnichidaeLimnichites browniPsephenidaePsephenopalpus browni''

Publications

Papers
Brown authored and co-authored dozens of scientific papers from 1941 to 2001.

Books
Aquatic Dryopoid Beetles (Coleoptera) Of The United States [Biota of Freshwater Ecosystems Identification Manual No. 6] (1972)
A catalog of the Coleoptera of America north of Mexico: Family : Dryopidae (Agriculture handbook) (1983)

External links
Dr. Harley Brown, Professor of Zoology

References 

1921 births
2008 deaths
American entomologists
University of Oklahoma faculty
20th-century American zoologists
Miami University alumni
Ohio State University alumni